The 2014 European Cross Country Championships was the 21st edition of the cross country running competition for European athletes which was held in Samokov, Bulgaria, on 14 December 2014. The events were hosted at Borovets – a winter sports and ski resort in the Rila mountains.

Race results

Senior men 

Totals: 75 entrants, 75 starters, 70 finishers, 9 finishing teams.

Senior women 

Totals: 62 entrants, 62 starters, 58 finishers, 7 finishing teams.

Under-23 men 

Totals: 75 entrants, 74 starters, 66 finishers, 10 finishing teams.

Under-23 women 

Totals: 60 entrants, 60 starters, 59 finishers, 9 finishing teams.

Junior men 

Totals: 105 entrants, 104 starters, 94 finishers, 17 finishing teams.

Junior women 

Totals: 76 entrants, 76 starters, 74 finishers, 10 finishing teams.

Medal table

References

External links 
 Results at European Athletics

European Cross Country Championships
European Cross Country Championships
European Cross Country Championships
European Cross Country Championships
International athletics competitions hosted by Bulgaria
Cross country running in Bulgaria
December 2014 sports events in Europe